Anthotium is a small genus of 3 or 4 species in the family Goodeniaceae which are found only in southwestern Australia.

Accepted species
Four species are accepted:
 Anthotium humile R.Br.
 Anthotium junciforme (de Vriese) D.A.Morrison
 Anthotium odontophyllum L.W.Sage
 Anthotium rubriflorum F.Muell. ex Benth.

References

 
Endemic flora of Southwest Australia
Asterales genera